Dariya may refer to:

 Daria (name), a female given name
 Alternative spelling of Diriyah, a town in Saudi Arabia
Diriyah Governorate, the governorate where the town is located
 Darija, a term used by North Africans to refer to Maghrebi Arabic
 Dariya Dil, a 1988 Bollywood family drama film
 Dariya Sahab, an Indian Saint of 17th Century

See also 
Daria (disambiguation)
 Darja, a term used by North Africans to refer to Maghrebi Arabic